Patapédia may refer to:

L'Ascension-de-Patapédia, Quebec, a municipality of Gaspésie, in Gaspésie-Îles-de-la-Madeleine administrative region
Patapédia River, a river of Gaspésie
Patapédia (township), township of Gaspésie